Non Suwan is a district (amphoe) in the western part of Buriram province, northeastern Thailand.

Geography
Neighboring districts are (from the north clockwise) Nong Ki, Nang Rong, Pakham of Buriram Province and Soeng Sang of Nakhon Ratchasima province.

History
The minor district (king amphoe) was created on 1 April 1991, when four tambons were split off from Nang Rong district. It was upgraded to a full district on 8 September 1995.

Motto
The Non Suwan District's motto is "The city farm plants, sweet fruit, beautiful silk, rocket festival, dairy cattle, many of rubber, and Olympic gold medal boxer."

Administration
The district is divided into four sub-districts (tambons), which are further subdivided into 56 villages (mubans). Non Suwan is a township (thesaban tambon) which covers parts of tambons Non Suwan and Krok Kaeo. There are also four tambon administrative organizations (TAO).

References

External links
amphoe.com
 

Non Suwan